Pilar Palomero (born 1980) is a Spanish film director and screenwriter.

Biography 
Born in Zaragoza in 1980, she has worked as camera operator, assistant, electrician, cinematographer, script editor, editor, scriptwriter and director. She studied at the University of Zaragoza and at the ECAM, where she earned a degree as cinematography director in 2006.

After her debut as director in Sonrisas (2005 short film), she directed other short films such as Niño Balcón and Chan Chán.

Palomero's directorial debut in a feature film, the 2020 coming-of-age drama Schoolgirls, earned her two Feroz Awards (Best Direction & Best Screenplay) and two Goya Awards (Best New Director & Best Original Screenplay).

Works

Director

Accolades

References

External links

1980 births
Spanish film directors
Spanish women film directors
Spanish women screenwriters
University of Zaragoza alumni
Living people
People from Zaragoza
21st-century Spanish screenwriters